is a Japanese figure skater. He is the 2019 Coupe du Printemps champion and placed fourth at the 2022 Four Continents Championships.

He is also the 2017–2018 Japanese national junior silver medalist and competed in the final segment at the 2018 World Junior Championships.

Personal life 
Miyake was born on March 26, 2002 in Yakage, Okayama, Japan.

His figure skating idol is Daisuke Takahashi.

Career

Early career 
Miyake finished 8th at the 2011–12 Japan Novice Championships and 7th the following season. He was awarded the silver medal at the 2013–14 Japan Novice Championships and finished 28th at the Japan Junior Championships. He won gold at the 2014–15 Japan Novice Championships and placed 30th at the Japan Junior Championships that same year. He was invited to skate in the gala at the 2014 NHK Trophy and 2015 World Team Trophy.

2015–16 season 
During the 2015–16 season, Miyake debuted on the ISU Junior Grand Prix (JGP) circuit. After placing 8th at his JGP event in Riga, Latvia, he finished 9th at the Japan Junior Championships.

2016–17 season 
Miyake started his season at JGP Japan in Yokohama, where he placed 11th. He finished 6th at the 2016–17 Japanese Junior national championships, which qualified him to participate at the senior nationals, where he finished 9th.

2017–18 season 
He started his season by winning gold at the 2017 Asian Trophy. His Junior Grand Prix assignment was JGP Austria, where he finished 8th. He won the silver medal at the 2017–18 Japanese Junior championships, 11th on the senior level and was selected to compete at the 2018 World Junior Figure Skating Championships in Sofia, Bulgaria. At the championships, he finished 18th with a total score of 174.66 points.

2018–19 season 
During the 2018–19 season, he was assigned to JGP Canada along with his compatriot Yuma Kagiyama. He placed 10th at the event in Richmond. At the Japanese Junior championships, he finished within the top six and was, therefore, eligible to compete at the senior championships. He placed 17th at the senior event in Osaka.  In March, he won the gold medal at the Coupe du Printemps in Luxembourg.

2019–20 season 
He was assigned to one Junior Grand Prix assignment in Egna, Italy. After placing sixth in the short program, he came twelfth in the free skate and finished in tenth place overall, achieving all-new personal best scores. At the 2019–20 Japanese Junior championships, he finished in seventh place.

2020–21 season 
Miyake was assigned to compete at the 2020 NHK Trophy, where he placed ninth.  He was tenth at the 2020–21 Japan Championships.

2021–22 season: Senior debut 
Miyake was seventh to start the season at the 2021 CS Cup of Austria.

At the 2021–22 Japan Championships, Miyake finished in sixth place. He was named as the third alternate for the Japanese Olympic team and sent to compete at the 2022 Four Continents Championships. Miyake finished fourth. He then won the silver medal at the Egna Trophy to conclude his season.

2022–23 season 
Given two Grand Prix assignments, Miyake began the season by placing eighth at the 2022 Skate America. At the Grand Prix de France, he placed tenth in the short program, but withdrew before the free program due to illness. Miyake then came twelfth at the 2022–23 Japan Championships.

Programs

Competitive highlights 
GP: Grand Prix; CS: Challenger Series; JGP: Junior Grand Prix

2015–16 season to present

Earlier career

Detailed results

Senior level 
Small medals for short and free programs awarded only at ISU Championships. At team events, medals awarded for team results only. ISU Personal bests in bold.

References

External links
 

2002 births
Living people
Japanese male single skaters